The Sikorsky/Lockheed Martin VH-92 Patriot is an American helicopter under development to replace the United States Marine Corps' Marine One U.S. presidential transport fleet. It is a militarized variant of the Sikorsky S-92.

Design and development

Sikorsky entered the VH-92 variant of the S-92 into the VXX competition for U.S. presidential helicopter Marine One (replacing the Sikorsky VH-3D Sea King and VH-60N White Hawk), but lost to the Lockheed Martin VH-71 Kestrel. However, the competition was restarted in 2010 due to ballooning VH-71 development costs, allowing Sikorsky to resubmit the VH-92 in April 2010. By mid-2013, all other aircraft manufacturers had dropped out of the contest, leaving only Sikorsky.

On 7 May 2014, it was announced that the VH-92 had won the VXX competition to replace the aging VH-3 Sea Kings that transport the President of the United States.

In May 2014, Sikorsky was awarded a US$1.24 billion contract to build a variant of the S-92 for transport of the U.S. president. Sikorsky will outfit this variant with an executive interior and military mission support systems, including triple electrical power and redundant flight controls. Six of the variant, designated VH-92A, were ordered by the U.S. Navy for delivery in 2017. Production of a further 17 aircraft is planned to begin in 2020. The total FY2015 program cost is $4.718 billion for 23 helicopters, at an average cost of $205M per aircraft. In July 2016, the design passed its Critical Design Review, which cleared it for production.

Operational history

On 28 July 2017, the first VH-92A performed its maiden flight at Sikorsky Aircraft's facilities in Stratford, Connecticut.

On 22 September 2018, a VH-92 was flown to the White House for take-off and landing tests at spots used for Marine One.

In late November 2021, Pentagon officials noted the aircraft was “failing to meet the reliability, availability or maintainability threshold requirements.” The statement noted that during test flights, the aircraft damaged landing zones with its exhaust and fuel leaks. The helicopter had not yet entered service carrying VIPs.

On 28 December 2021, the VH-92 achieved its Initial Operational Capability (IOC) milestone. However, the aircraft, named "Patriot" in 2022, will not be able to carry the president or vice president due to ongoing issues with its encrypted communications systems.

Variants
 VH-92A Patriot: 21 planned
 CH-92A: 2 planned for training

Operators

 United States Marine Corps (23 on order)

Specifications (S-92)

See also

References

Notes

Bibliography

 Leoni, Ray D. (2007). Black Hawk: The Story of a World Class Helicopter. American Institute of Aeronautics and Astronautics. .

External links

 Sikorsky S-92 page on Lockheedmartin.com
 US Navy VH-92A Fact File page
 US Navy VH-92A Navair page

2010s United States helicopters
VH-092
VH-092
Twin-turbine helicopters
2010s United States military transport aircraft
United States military helicopters
Aircraft first flown in 2017